Jonas Wohlfarth-Bottermann (born 20 February 1990) is a German professional basketball player for the Hamburg Towers of the Basketball Bundesliga.

Professional career
In June 2013, he signed a 3-year deal with the German powerhouse Alba Berlin.

On July 28, 2019, he signed a two-year contract with MHP Riesen Ludwigsburg.

On June 10, 2022, Wohlfarth-Bottermann signed with Hamburg Towers of German Basketball Bundesliga.

Career statistics

EuroLeague

|-
| style="text-align:left;"| 2014–15
| style="text-align:left;"| Alba Berlin
| 15 || 1 || 8.9 || .488 || .000 || .261 || 1.9 || .1 || .3 || .3 || 3.1 || 2.4
|- class="sortbottom"
| style="text-align:center;" colspan=2 | Career
| 15 || 1 || 8.9 || .488 || .000 || .261 || 1.9 || .1 || .3 || .3 || 3.1 || 2.4

Honours
BBL-Pokal (2013)
2x BBL Champions Cup (2013, 2014)
ProA (2010)
Individual
NBBL All-Star Game MVP (2009)
EuroChallenge blocks leader (2013)

References

External links
 Jonas Wohlfarth-Bottermann at eurobasket.com
 Jonas Wohlfarth-Bottermann at euroleague.net

1990 births
Living people
Alba Berlin players
Centers (basketball)
German men's basketball players
Hamburg Towers players
Riesen Ludwigsburg players
Skyliners Frankfurt players
Sportspeople from Bonn
Telekom Baskets Bonn players